Chris Kilmore (born January 21, 1973) is an American musician and DJ. He is the turntablist and keyboardist of the rock band Incubus since 1998.

Discography
 Make Yourself (1999)
 When Incubus Attacks Volume 1 (2000)
 Morning View (2001)
 A Crow Left of the Murder... (2004)
 Light Grenades (2006)
 Monuments and Melodies (2009)
 If Not Now, When? (2011)
 Trust Fall (Side A) (2015)
 8 (2017)
 Trust Fall (Side B) (2020)

See also
List of turntablists

References

DJ biography

1973 births
Living people
Incubus (band) members
African-American DJs
Rock DJs
Musicians from Pennsylvania
African-American rock musicians
People from Dillsburg, Pennsylvania
American rock keyboardists
21st-century American keyboardists